Saad Awad (born June 7, 1983) is an American mixed martial artist competing in Bellator's lightweight division. A professional competitor since 2006, Awad has formerly competed for Strikeforce and King of the Cage.

Background
Born in San Bernardino, California to a Palestinian father and a Brazilian mother, Awad is the fourth eldest of twelve siblings. Growing up, Awad competed in soccer and wrestling at Cajon High School and later wrestled for a semester at a junior college. Later, Awad stumbled upon mixed martial arts and eventually moved to Las Vegas, Nevada.

Mixed martial arts career

Early career
Awad started his career in 2006. He fought mainly for the Costa Rican promotion Titans of the Pentagon and for the Californian promotion Gladiator Challenge.

For Titans of the Pentagon, he compiled four victories, winning a four-man tournament on the way.

For Gladiator Challenge, he had his first defeat against Nam Phan on February 16, 2008 at GC 74. Despite having lost his GC debut, Awad won the Gladiator Challenge Lightweight Championship against Kyle Olsen on October 25, 2008 at GC 85.

Strikeforce
Awad faced Joe Duarte on April 9, 2011 at Strikeforce: Diaz vs. Daley. He lost via submission in the second round.

The Ultimate Fighter
Awad appeared in the first episode of The Ultimate Fighter: Team Carwin vs. Team Nelson. He lost via unanimous decision against Joey Rivera during the entry round.

Bellator MMA
Awad made his Bellator MMA debut on January 25, 2009 at Bellator 10 against Diego Garijo. He lost via submission in the first round.

On January 31, 2013 at Bellator 87, Awad was expected to face Jason Fischer. However, he had to replace Patricky Freire in the quarterfinal match of Bellator Season Eight Lightweight Tournament due to a knee injury against Guillaume DeLorenzi. He won via KO 31 seconds into the first round.

In the semifinals, Awad faced Will Brooks on February 28, 2013 at Bellator 91. In a major upset, Awad knocked out the heavily favored Brooks via KO in under a minute once again.

Awad faced David Rickels in the tournament finals at Bellator 94. He lost the fight via TKO due to a highly controversial finish.  Rickels dropped Awad with a right hand at the very end of the round, but Awad remained resting on his back instead of getting up to his corner, resulting in the referee declaring an end to the match.

Awad next faced British fighter Martin Stapleton in the quarterfinal match of Bellator season nine lightweight tournament on September 27, 2013 at Bellator 101. He won the fight via submission in the first round.

Awad had a rematch with Will Brooks in the semifinal round on October 25, 2013 at Bellator 105. He lost via unanimous decision (30-27, 30–27, 30-27).

Awad fought Joe Duarte at Bellator 122 in a rematch from their 2011 bout. He won the fight via TKO in the first round where he locked in an arm triangle, and elbowed Duarte. Duarte punched Awad in the head and made him suffer from symptoms of concussion.

Awad faced undefeated Sergio Rios on October 3, 2014 at Bellator 127. He won the fight via unanimous decision.

Awad faced Rob Sinclair at Bellator 136 on April 10, 2015.  He won the fight by unanimous decision.

Awad faced Patricky Freire at Bellator 141 on August 28, 2015.  He lost the fight by unanimous decision.

Awad moved up to the welterweight division and faced Evangelista Santos at Bellator 154 on May 14, 2016. Awad defeated the veteran via TKO after repeated strikes on the ground while Santos held on to a submission attempt.

Returning to lightweight, Awad faced Derek Anderson at Bellator 160 on August 26, 2016. In a back-and-forth affair, in which both fighters traded near submission finishes, Awad ultimately lost the fight via unanimous decision.

Awad again moved up to the welterweight division and faced Brennan Ward at Bellator 163 on November 4, 2016. He lost the fight via knockout in the first round.

Awad faced Ryan Quinn at Bellator 178 on April 21, 2017. He won the back-and-forth fight via unanimous decision.

Awad faced Zach Freeman at Bellator 186 on November 3, 2017. He won the fight via TKO in the first round.

Awad faced J.J. Ambrose at Bellator 193 on January 26, 2018. He won the fight via unanimous decision.

Awad fought Ryan Couture at Bellator 201 on June 29, 2018, winning the fight via technical knockout.

Awad faced Benson Henderson at Bellator 208 on October 13, 2018. He lost the fight by unanimous decision.

As the first bout of his new contract with Bellator, Awad faced Goiti Yamauchi at Bellator 229 on October 4, 2019. He lost the fight via a verbal submission due to an armbar in the first round.

Awad stepped in as a short-notice replacement for Sabah Homasi against Paul Daley at Bellator 232 on October 26, 2019. He lost the fight via TKO in the second round.

Awad then faced Mandel Nallo at Bellator 249 on October 15, 2020. Nallo kneed Awad in the groin rendering him unable to continue the bout, leading to a no contest.

Awad faced Nate Andrews on May 21, 2021 at Bellator 259 He won the bout via TKO in the first round after dropping Andrews multiple times, leading to the referee calling the bout.

Awad faced Chris Gonzalez on January 29, 2022 at Bellator 273. He lost the bout via head kick knockout 36 seconds into the first round.

Personal life
Awad and his wife Britni live in Riverside, California with their daughter and son.

Championships and accomplishments
Bellator Fighting Championships
Bellator Season 8 Lightweight Tournament Runner-Up
Most losses in Bellator history (10)
Gladiator Challenge
Gladiator Challenge Lightweight Championship (One time)
Titans of the Pentagon
TOTP Four-Man Welterweight Tournament Winner (2007)
MMAJunkie.com
2019 March Fight of the Month vs. Brandon Girtz

Mixed martial arts record

|-
|Loss
|align=center|24–14 (1)
|Chris Gonzalez
|KO (head kick and punches)
|Bellator 273
|
|align=center|1
|align=center|0:36
|Phoenix, Arizona, United States
|
|-
|Win
|align=center|24–13 (1)
|Nate Andrews
|TKO (punches)
|Bellator 259 
|
|align=center|1
|align=center|3:16
|Uncasville, Connecticut, United States
|
|-
|NC
|align=center|23–13 (1)
|Mandel Nallo 
|NC (accidental low blow)
|Bellator 249
|
|align=center|1
|align=center|1:44
|Uncasville, Connecticut, United States
|
|-
|Loss
|align=center|23–13
|Paul Daley 
|TKO (punches)
|Bellator 232
|
|align=center|2
|align=center|1:30
|Uncasville, Connecticut, United States
|
|-
| Loss
| align=center|23–12
|Goiti Yamauchi
|Verbal Submission (armbar)
|Bellator 229
|
|align=center| 1
|align=center| 1:40
|Temecula, California, United States
|
|-
| Loss
| align=center|23–11
| Brandon Girtz
| Decision (unanimous)
| Bellator 219
| 
| align=center| 3
| align=center| 5:00
| Temecula, California, United States
|
|-
| Loss
| align=center|23–10
| Benson Henderson
| Decision (unanimous)
| Bellator 208
| 
| align=center| 3
| align=center| 5:00
| Uniondale, New York, United States
|
|-
| Win
| align=center|23–9
| Ryan Couture
| TKO (punches)
| Bellator 201
| 
| align=center| 1
| align=center| 4:29
| Temecula, California, United States
|
|-
|Win
|align=center|22–9
|J.J. Ambrose
|Decision (unanimous)
|Bellator 193
|
|align=center|3
|align=center|5:00
|Temecula, California, United States
|
|-
|Win
|align=center|21–9
|Zach Freeman
|TKO (punch)
|Bellator 186
|
|align=center|1
|align=center|1:07
|University Park, Pennsylvania, United States
|
|-
|Win
|align=center|20–9
|Ryan Quinn
|Decision (unanimous)
|Bellator 178
|
|align=center|3
|align=center|5:00
|Uncasville, Connecticut, United States
|
|-
|Loss
|align=center|19–9
|Brennan Ward
|KO (punches)
|Bellator 163
|
|align=center|1
|align=center|1:26
|Uncasville, Connecticut, United States
|
|-
| Loss
| align=center| 19–8
| Derek Anderson
| Decision (unanimous)
| Bellator 160
| 
| align=center| 3
| align=center| 5:00
| Anaheim, California, United States
| 
|-
| Win
| align=center| 19–7
| Evangelista Santos
| TKO (punches)
| Bellator 154
| 
| align=center| 1
| align=center| 4:31
| San Jose, California, United States
| 
|-
| Loss
| align=center| 18–7
| Patricky Freire
| Decision (unanimous)
| Bellator 141
| 
| align=center| 3
| align=center| 5:00
| Temecula, California, United States
| 
|-
| Win
| align=center| 18–6
| Rob Sinclair
| Decision (unanimous)
| Bellator 136
| 
| align=center| 3
| align=center| 5:00
| Irvine, California, United States
| 
|-
| Win
| align=center| 17–6
| Sergio Rios
| Decision (unanimous)
| Bellator 127
| 
| align=center| 3
| align=center| 5:00
| Temecula, California, United States
| 
|-
| Win
| align=center| 16–6
| Joe Duarte
| TKO (elbows)
| Bellator 122
| 
| align=center| 1
| align=center| 1:18
| Temecula, California, United States
| 
|-
| Loss
| align=center| 15–6
| Will Brooks
| Decision (unanimous)
| Bellator 105
| 
| align=center| 3
| align=center| 5:00
| Rio Rancho, New Mexico, United States
| 
|-
| Win
| align=center| 15–5
| Martin Stapleton
| Submission (rear naked choke)
| Bellator 101
| 
| align=center| 1
| align=center| 3:46
| Portland, Oregon, United States
| 
|-
| Loss
| align=center| 14–5
| David Rickels 
| TKO (punches)
| Bellator 94
| 
| align=center| 2
| align=center| 5:00
| Tampa, Florida, United States
| 
|-
| Win
| align=center| 14–4
| Will Brooks
| KO (punches)
| Bellator 91
| 
| align=center| 1
| align=center| 0:43
| Rio Rancho, New Mexico, United States
| 
|-
| Win
| align=center| 13–4
| Guillaume DeLorenzi
| KO (punches)
| Bellator 87
| 
| align=center| 1
| align=center| 0:31
| Mount Pleasant, Michigan, United States
| 
|-
| Win
| align=center| 12–4
| Daniel McWilliams
| Submission
| IES: Inland Empire Strikes
| 
| align=center| 1
| align=center| 1:16
| Ontario, California, United States
| 
|-
| Win
| align=center| 11–4
| Matt Shorey
| TKO (punches)
| Gladiator Challenge: Star Wars
| 
| align=center| 1
| align=center| 0:28
| San Jacinto, California, United States
| 
|-
| Win
| align=center| 10–4
| Andy Morales
| Submission (rear-naked choke)
| MEZ Sports: Pandemonium 6
| 
| align=center| 2
| align=center| 3:59
| Riverside, California, United States
|Return to Lightweight.
|-
| Win
| align=center| 9–4
| Joey Nier
| KO (punch)
| Gladiator Challenge: Pro-Am Series 2
| 
| align=center| 1
| align=center| 0:11
| San Jacinto, California, United States
| 
|-
| Loss
| align=center| 8–4
| Joe Duarte
| Submission (armbar)
| Strikeforce: Diaz vs. Daley
| 
| align=center| 2
| align=center| 2:45
| San Diego, California, United States
|Lightweight bout.
|-
| Win
| align=center| 8–3
| Bryson Kamaka
| TKO (punches)
| KOTC: Sniper
| 
| align=center| 1
| align=center| 0:21
| San Bernardino, California, United States
| 
|-
| Loss
| align=center| 7–3
| Diego Garijo
| Submission (rear-naked choke)
| Bellator 10
| 
| align=center| 1
| align=center| 4:45
| Ontario, California, United States
|Lightweight bout.
|-
| Loss
| align=center| 7–2
| Karen Darabedyan
| Decision (split)
| Gladiator Challenge: Revolution
| 
| align=center| 3
| align=center| 5:00
| Los Angeles, California, United States
|Welterweight debut.
|-
| Win
| align=center| 7–1
| Jorge Britto
| Decision (majority)
| CCF 3: Undisputed
| 
| align=center| 2
| align=center| 5:00
| Edmonton, Alberta, Canada
| 
|-
| Win
| align=center| 6–1
| Kyle Olsen
| Submission
| GC 85: Cross Fire
| 
| align=center| 1
| align=center| 1:14
| San Diego, California, United States
| 
|-
| Loss
| align=center| 5–1
| Nam Phan
| TKO (punches)
| GC 74: Evolution
| 
| align=center| 2
| align=center| 0:52
| Los Angeles, California, United States
| 
|-
| Win
| align=center| 5–0
| Evan Vasquez Matus
| TKO
| TOTP: Titans of the Pentagon
| 
| align=center| 1
| align=center| N/A
| San José, Costa Rica
| 
|-
| Win
| align=center| 4–0
| Eric Beitia
| Submission (guillotine choke)
| TOTP: Titans of the Pentagon
| 
| align=center| N/A
| align=center| N/A
| San José, Costa Rica
| 
|-
| Loss
| align=center| 3–0
| Ludwing Salazar
| KO (punch)
| rowspan=2| TOTP: Titans of the Pentagon
| rowspan=2| 
| align=center| 1
| align=center| 4:50
| rowspan=2| San José, Costa Rica
| 
|-
| Win
| align=center| 2–0
| Wilberth Montoya
| Submission (rear-naked choke)
| align=center| 1
| align=center| 1:30
| 
|-
| Win
| align=center| 1–0
| Art Ruiz
| DQ
| KOTC: The Return
| 
| align=center| 1
| align=center| 4:43
| San Jacinto, California, United States
|

See also
List of male mixed martial artists
List of current Bellator fighters

References

External links
 
 

1983 births
Living people
American people of Palestinian descent
American sportspeople of Brazilian descent
American male mixed martial artists
Lightweight mixed martial artists
Welterweight mixed martial artists
Mixed martial artists utilizing collegiate wrestling
Mixed martial artists from California
Bellator male fighters
American male sport wrestlers
Amateur wrestlers
Sportspeople from San Bernardino, California